Hampton Veterans Affairs Medical Center National Cemetery (Hampton VAMC National Cemetery) is a United States National Cemetery located in the city of Hampton, Virginia. It encompasses only 0.2 of an acre, and has 22 interments. It is currently closed to new interments.

History 
The Hampton VAMC National Cemetery is the smallest cemetery overseen by the Department of Veterans Affairs. It is located on the grounds of the Hampton Veterans Affairs Medical Center. It was established in 1898 at the Southern Branch of the National Home for Volunteer Soldiers during a strict quarantine for a yellow fever epidemic.   Every man who died during the quarantine was buried on site, because no one was allowed to enter or leave the station. All burials took place between July 30 and August 15, 1899. Twenty-two were buried, most of them from New York and Pennsylvania.

Administration of the cemetery was transferred from the United States Army to the Department of Veterans Affairs in 1973. Hampton was one of 21 VA cemeteries on medical center grounds that were merged into the United States National Cemetery System.

See also
 Hampton National Cemetery
 List of Veterans Affairs medical facilities

References

Further reading
 National Soldiers' Home

External links 
 National Cemetery Administration
 

Cemeteries in Hampton, Virginia
Buildings and structures in Hampton, Virginia
United States national cemeteries
Tourist attractions in Hampton, Virginia
1898 establishments in Virginia